Ove Rullestad (born 10 March 1940) is a Norwegian politician for the Conservative Party.

He served as a deputy representative to the Norwegian Parliament from Vest-Agder during the term 1997–2001.

On the local level he was the mayor of Farsund from 1991 to 2003.

References

1940 births
Living people
Deputy members of the Storting
Conservative Party (Norway) politicians
Mayors of places in Vest-Agder
People from Farsund
20th-century Norwegian politicians